In five-dimensional geometry, a cantellated 5-orthoplex is a convex uniform 5-polytope, being a cantellation of the regular 5-orthoplex.

There are 6 cantellation for the 5-orthoplex, including truncations. Some of them are more easily constructed from the dual 5-cube.

Cantellated 5-orthoplex

Alternate names 
 Cantellated 5-orthoplex
 Bicantellated 5-demicube
 Small rhombated triacontiditeron (Acronym: sart) (Jonathan Bowers)

Coordinates 
The vertices of the can be made in 5-space, as permutations and sign combinations of:
 (0,0,1,1,2)

Images 
The cantellated 5-orthoplex is constructed by a cantellation operation applied to the 5-orthoplex.

Cantitruncated 5-orthoplex

Alternate names
 Cantitruncated pentacross
 Cantitruncated triacontiditeron (Acronym: gart) (Jonathan Bowers)

Coordinates 
Cartesian coordinates for the vertices of a cantitruncated 5-orthoplex, centered at the origin, are all sign and coordinate permutations of
 (±3,±2,±1,0,0)

Images

Related polytopes 

These polytopes are from a set of 31 uniform 5-polytopes generated from the regular 5-cube or 5-orthoplex.

Notes

References 
 H.S.M. Coxeter: 
 H.S.M. Coxeter, Regular Polytopes, 3rd Edition, Dover New York, 1973 
 Kaleidoscopes: Selected Writings of H.S.M. Coxeter, edited by F. Arthur Sherk, Peter McMullen, Anthony C. Thompson, Asia Ivic Weiss, Wiley-Interscience Publication, 1995,  
 (Paper 22) H.S.M. Coxeter, Regular and Semi Regular Polytopes I, [Math. Zeit. 46 (1940) 380-407, MR 2,10]
 (Paper 23) H.S.M. Coxeter, Regular and Semi-Regular Polytopes II, [Math. Zeit. 188 (1985) 559-591]
 (Paper 24) H.S.M. Coxeter, Regular and Semi-Regular Polytopes III, [Math. Zeit. 200 (1988) 3-45]
 Norman Johnson Uniform Polytopes, Manuscript (1991)
 N.W. Johnson: The Theory of Uniform Polytopes and Honeycombs, Ph.D. 
  x3o3x3o4o - sart, x3x3x3o4o - gart

External links 
 
 Polytopes of Various Dimensions, Jonathan Bowers
 Multi-dimensional Glossary

5-polytopes